Coleophora eumorphella is a moth of the family Coleophoridae.

References

eumorphella
Moths described in 1994